Cossie or Cossies may refer to:

 Cossie, term for swimsuit
 Cossie, a member of TSD (band)
 Cossies, an alternative name for Liverpool pop band 28 Costumes
 Cosworth